Albert Norman Levine (October 22, 1923 – June 14, 2005) was a Canadian short story writer, novelist and poet. He is perhaps best remembered for his terse prose. Though he was part of the St. Ives artistic community in Cornwall, and friends with painters Patrick Heron and Francis Bacon, his written expression was not abstract, but concrete. "The leaner the language the more suggestive," he wrote in his 1993 essay, Sometimes It Works.

Life and career
Norman Levine was born on October 22, 1923 in Minsk, Poland, but spent most of his adult life in England.

His Jewish family had fled from Poland to Canada with the advent of anti-Semitism in the years prior to World War II. His adolescence was spent on the streets of Ottawa, but his coming of age was his time as a Lancaster bomber pilot for the Canadian division of the Royal Air Force. He was based at Leeming.

Post-war he met an Englishwoman, Margaret, settled down and had three children. His writing, a reflection of his life, was also a direct influence on that life, as he had little money to keep up rent payments; as a result his family often moved.

After England he lived, for a time, in Canada, with his second wife. He also lived in France before finally returning to England, where he died ten years later.

In 2002 he was presented with the Matt Cohen Prize (established in 2001 by the Writers' Trust of Canada to recognize a lifetime of work by a Canadian writer).

Bibliography

Short stories
 One Way Ticket (1961)
 I Don’t Want to Know Anyone Too Well (1971) (translated into German by Annemarie Böll as"Ein kleines Stückchen Blau")
 Thin Ice (1979)
 Why Do You Live So Far Away? (1984) (translated into German by Annemarie Böll as "Der Spielplatz")
 Champagne Barn (1984)
 The Beat and the Still (1990)
 Something Happened Here (1991)
 The Ability to Forget (2003)

Novels
 The Angled Road (1952)
 From a Seaside Town (1970)

Poetry
 Myssium (1948)
 The Tight-rope Walker (1950)
I Walk by the Harbour (1976)

Non-fiction
Canada Made Me (1958)
"Sometimes It Works" (in How Stories Mean, edited by John Metcalf and J.R. Struthers) (1993)

Editor
 Canadian Winter's Tales (1968)

References

External links
 York University Archives 
 Norman Levine entry at The Canadian Encyclopedia

1923 births
2005 deaths
Canadian male short story writers
Jewish Canadian writers
Canadian people of Polish-Jewish descent
Writers from Ottawa
20th-century Canadian short story writers
20th-century Canadian male writers
Royal Canadian Air Force personnel of World War II
Canadian World War II pilots
Polish emigrants to Canada